The 2022 BWF World Tour (officially known as 2022 HSBC BWF World Tour for sponsorship reasons) was the fifth season of the BWF World Tour of badminton, a circuit of 20 tournaments which led up to the World Tour Finals tournament. The 20 tournaments were divided into five levels: Level 1 was the said World Tour Finals, Level 2 called Super 1000 (two tournaments), Level 3 called Super 750 (four tournaments), Level 4 called Super 500 (six tournaments) and Level 5 called Super 300 (seven tournaments). Each of these tournaments offers different ranking points and prize money. The highest points and prize pool were offered at the Super 1000 level (including the World Tour Finals).

One other category of tournament, the BWF Tour Super 100 (level 6), also offered BWF World Tour ranking points. It was an important part of the pathway and entry point for players into the BWF World Tour tournaments. When the five Level 6 grade tournaments of the BWF Tour Super 100 were included, the complete tour consisted of 25 tournaments.

Results 
Below is the schedule released by the Badminton World Federation:

Key

Winners

Finals 
This is the complete schedule of events on the 2022 calendar, with the champions and runners-up documented.

January

February 
No World Tour tournaments held in February.

March

April

May

June

July

August

September

October

November

December

Statistics

Performance by countries 
Below are the 2022 BWF World Tour performances by countries. Only countries who have won a title are listed:

 BWF World Tour

 BWF Tour Super 100

Performance by categories 
Tables were calculated after the BWF World Tour Finals.

Men's singles 
Not counting the Syed Modi International, which was not awarded due to both finalists contracted with COVID-19.

Women's singles

Men's doubles

Women's doubles

Mixed doubles

World Tour Finals rankings 
The points are calculated from the following levels:
BWF World Tour Super 1000,
BWF World Tour Super 750, 
BWF World Tour Super 500, 
BWF World Tour Super 300,
BWF Tour Super 100.

Information on Points, Won, Lost, and % columns were calculated after the 2022 Australian Open.
Key

Men's singles 
The table below was based on the ranking of men's singles as of 22 November 2022.

Women's singles 
The table below was based on the ranking of women's singles as of 22 November 2022.

Men's doubles 
The table below was based on the ranking of men's doubles as of 22 November 2022.

Women's doubles 
The table below was based on the ranking of women's doubles as of 22 November 2022.

Mixed doubles 
The table below was based on the ranking of mixed doubles as of 15 November 2022.

References

External links
 Official website of BWF World Tour

 
World Tour
BWF World Tour